The 2022 Liberty Bowl was a college football bowl game played on December 28, 2022, at Simmons Bank Liberty Stadium in Memphis, Tennessee, United States. The 64th annual Liberty Bowl, the game featured the Kansas Jayhawks from the Big 12 Conference and the Arkansas Razorbacks from the Southeastern Conference (SEC). The game began at 4:35 p.m. CST and was aired on ESPN. It was one of the 2022–23 bowl games concluding the 2022 FBS football season. The primary sponsor of the game was automotive store AutoZone and the contest was officially named the AutoZone Liberty Bowl.

Both teams entered having started the season well but finished poorly: Kansas won their first five games and were ranked in the AP Poll for the first time since 2009, but finished 6–6 after losing their last three games and six of their final seven. Arkansas received a preseason ranking of No. 19 and started the year 3–0 before losing three straight and finishing the year 1–3 in their final four games. Kansas made their first bowl appearance since the 2008 Insight Bowl while Arkansas made their second straight after playing in the 2022 Outback Bowl. Previews praised both quarterbacks, as Jalon Daniels returned from injury to a productive end to the season and KJ Jefferson ranked highly in the SEC in passing yardage; running backs Devin Neal and Raheim Sanders were also viewed as assets to each team's offense. The Razorbacks saw some personnel changes leading up to the game: defensive coordinator Barry Odom became the head coach at UNLV and both sides of the ball saw departures and opt-outs, including Drew Sanders, Bumper Pool, and Jadon Haselwood.

Teams

The Liberty Bowl featured the Kansas Jayhawks from the Big 12 Conference and the Arkansas Razorbacks from the Southeastern Conference. The Jayhawks and Razorbacks had previously only met twice, in 1905 and 1906, with the Jayhawks winning both games. Both teams became bowl eligible by beating a ranked team: Kansas beat No. 18 Oklahoma State and Arkansas beat No. 14 Ole Miss.

Previews of the game viewed the teams similarly, with both offenses generally praised and expected to do well against each other's defenses. Quarterback play was seen as a high point for each team, with Jalon Daniels and KJ Jefferson each performing well over the course of the season. Momentum was viewed in Kansas's favor despite the disappointing end to both teams' seasons, since the Jayhawks' appearance ended their bowl drought of 14 years. Overall, Arkansas was favored to win the game by 2.5 points.

Kansas

The Jayhawks entered the game with a 6–6 record and a 3–5 mark in Big 12 Conference games. They started the season with a 5–0 record and were ranked for the first time since 2009, but fell out of the rankings after losing back-to-back games. The Jayhawks made their first bowl game appearance since the 2008 Insight Bowl and their second all-time appearance in the Liberty Bowl, with the first in 1973.

Kansas quarterback Jalon Daniels was praised by many for his performance early in the season, but suffered an injury during the Jayhawks' game against TCU and missed four weeks before returning to action. Analysts noted that he had been effective since his return, and he finished the regular season having totaled nearly 1,500 passing yards and 400 rushing yards in addition to 19 total touchdowns. The Kansas defense was cited by analysts as a potential weak point for the team, though the contrast between the Kansas offense and the opposing Arkansas defense was viewed favorably for Kansas; Daniels' ability to run and pass as well as the availability and effectiveness of running back Devin Neal were seen as advantages over an Arkansas defense that entered the game ranked 13th of 14 in their conference in pass efficiency defense, 13th in yards per play allowed and 11th in overall scoring defense. The Jayhawks had relatively little concern regarding opt-outs, especially as compared to Arkansas.

Arkansas

Arkansas began the season ranked No. 19 and won their first three contests but lost their next three and finished the season losing three of their last four games; they entered the game with a record of 6–6, with a 3–5 record in SEC contests. This was Arkansas' 44th bowl appearance all-time and their second in a row after playing in the 2022 Outback Bowl. This was the Razorbacks' sixth appearance in the Liberty Bowl, with their last coming in the January 2016 edition against Kansas State.

Quarterback KJ Jefferson and running back Raheim Sanders were projected to be the biggest pieces of Arkansas' offense, with the former having announced on December 3 that he would forgo the NFL Draft in favor of a final year at Arkansas and the latter finishing in second place in the SEC for total rushing yards during the season. Like Kansas, the Razorback defense was cited as a potential liability as they gave up a large number of yards to many opponents in the regular season. The Razorbacks were missing several players for the game due to either the NCAA transfer portal, injury, or NFL Draft preparation; on offense, wide receiver Ketron Jackson and tight end Trey Knox transferred after the end of the regular season and wide receiver Jadon Haselwood decided to opt out of the game for the draft. On defense, linebackers Bumper Pool and Drew Sanders did not play due to injury and draft preparation, respectively, while tackle Isaiah Nichols opted to transfer. In total, only 51 scholarship players dressed for the game for Arkansas. Additionally, Arkansas was without former defensive coordinator Barry Odom, who accepted the head coaching position at UNLV on December 6.

Game summary

The Liberty Bowl was televised by ESPN, with a commentary team of Dave O'Brien, Dan Mullen, and Taylor McGregor. The ESPN Radio broadcast was commentated by Clay Matvick, Rocky Boiman, and Tera Talmadge. The game's officiating crew, representing the Pac-12 Conference, was led by referee Matthew Richards and umpire Michael Stephens.

First half

Arkansas got the ball to begin the game as Tabor Allen's opening kickoff was fair caught for a touchback. Arkansas faced 3rd & 5 early but converted it with a 10-yard pass from KJ Jefferson to Harper Cole, which was followed shortly by rushes of 15 yards from Jefferson and 12 yards by Raheim Sanders. After a pair of short gains, placekicker Cam Little made a 37-yard field goal to open the scoring and take a 3–0 lead. Kansas opened their first drive with a pair of gains, first for 7 yards on a Devin Neal rush and then for 24 yards on a pass from Jalon Daniels to Luke Grimm. After a 10-yard Daniels rush two plays later, Daniels passed to Ky Thomas for a 29-yard touchdown, giving the Jayhawks the lead. On their second drives, both teams traded three-and-outs; Arkansas gained seven yards on a Jefferson rush but were unable to pick up the remaining three yards and punted to the Kansas 37-yard-line, but a fumble on Kansas' first play set them back four yards and they punted after two incomplete passes. Arkansas took possession at their own 32-yard-line and began with a 9-yard rush by AJ Green, after which Jefferson found Matt Landers for a 59-yard touchdown pass that gave Arkansas the lead. Cam Little's extra point gave the Razorbacks a three-point lead. The ensuing kickoff was muffed by Sevion Morrison and recovered by Cole for Arkansas at the Kansas 17-yard-line. The Razorbacks scored in one play as Jefferson passed to Ty Washington for a touchdown, making the score 17–7 Arkansas. Jake Bates' kickoff went out for a touchback and Daniels completed a pass for 35 yards to Lawrence Arnold to quickly advance into Arkansas territory. After a 12-yard pass to Torry Locklin, Daniels' pass was intercepted by Quincey McAdoo, who returned it 17 yards to the Arkansas 27-yard-line. Rashod Dubinion lost 4 yards on a rush on the first play of Arkansas' ensuing drive, but Jefferson passed to Jaedon Wilson for a 30-yard gain two plays later to reach Kansas territory. Jefferson gained another first down on the ground two plays later with an 8-yard gain, and he rushed for 15 yards several plays later to reach the Kansas 7-yard-line. The Razorbacks concluded the drive with 23 seconds left as Jefferson rushed for a 3-yard touchdown, stretching the lead to seventeen points. Kansas got one play off before the end of the quarter, as Daniels passed to Neal for a 15-yard gain before time expired.

Kansas began the second quarter with a pass completed from Daniels to Arnold that reached the Kansas 49-yard-line, and Daniels rushed for a first down on the next play. After moderate gains on the next few plays, Daniels was intercepted by Dwight McGlothern at the Arkansas 35-yard-line, though he was penalized for unsportsmanlike conduct back to the Arkansas 15-yard-line. The Razorbacks started their next drive with a 12-yard pass from Jefferson to Green but they stalled from there and punted after gaining five yards on their next three plays. The punt was downed at the Kansas 45-yard-line, though the Jayhawks were similarly unproductive as Daniels rushed for a loss of 5 yards on first down and was sacked by Jordan Domineck and Terry Hampton, losing 3 yards, on third down. Grayden Addison punted for the Jayhawks on fourth down, and the kick was fair caught on the Arkansas 22-yard-line. Dubinion rushed for 2 yards before Jefferson passed for 17 yards to Bryce Stephens, earning a first down; Dubinion gained 26 yards on a rush several plays later to reach Kansas territory at the 35-yard-line. After a timeout, Jefferson passed to Green for 10 yards and Green scored on a 20-yard rush on the next play; Little's extra point made the Arkansas lead 24 points. The ensuing kickoff by Bates went out for a touchback and Daniels completed an 11-yard pass to Arnold to convert a third down after a pair of short rushes by Neal. Grimm was the recipient of a 17-yard pass from Daniels later in the drive, and the Jayhawks found the end zone four plays later with a 24-yard pass to Mason Fairchild. Kansas opted to try a two-point conversion, which was unsuccessful. Arkansas started their next drive with 78 seconds left in the half at their own 25-yard-line; Dubinion rushed for 13 yards on the first play of the drive and for 12 yards two plays later. On the next play, Jefferson rushed for 32 yards and advanced the ball to the Kansas 9-yard-line with a personal foul after the play, though his pass into the end zone was intercepted by O.J. Burroughs for a touchback. Kansas took a knee to end the half on their next play.

Second half
Kansas got the ball to begin the second half as Bates' kickoff went out for a touchback. Daniels' pass to Grimm lost 7 yards on their second play but they made up for it with a 27-yard pass to Arnold to earn a first down. They gained 6 yards on a Neal rush but were unable to pick up any additional yardage and pooch punted on 4th & 4, which went out for a touchback. Three rushes for 11 yards earned the Razorbacks a first down before a pair of rushes, the first by Dubinion for 17 yards and the second to Bryce Stephens for 21. Jefferson passed to Jaedon Wilson for a 17-yard gain to enter the red zone and Dubinion reached the Kansas 7-yard-line with a rush on the next play. He carried for 5 yards and then for 2 yards to score a touchdown, giving Arkansas a 25-point lead just under halfway through the third quarter. Kansas was unable to respond as they went three-and-out, gaining only one yard on three plays, and their punt was returned to the Arkansas 48-yard-line. Arkansas was not able to do any better, as they were set back fifteen yards by an unsportsmanlike conduct penalty and were unable to earn back the yardage required and punted back to the Jayhawks at the Kansas 14-yard-line. A 9-yard pass and a 6-yard rush began Kansas' next drive before Daniels passed to Grimm for a gain of 45 yards. He followed with a 20-yard pass to Fairchild before a pass interference call gave Kansas the ball on the Arkansas 2-yard-line. Ky Thomas rushed for a touchdown on the next play, and Owen Piepergerdes kicked the extra point. Arkansas started with two Dubinion rushes on their next series which went for no gain and one yard, respectively, but an incomplete pass on third down forced the Razorbacks to punt again; this kick was downed on the Kansas 37-yard-line. Daniels started quickly with a 28-yard pass to Locklin and another 10-yard completion to Locklin converted a third down several plays later. Kansas were not able to run another play before the clock expired for the end of the third quarter.

The Jayhawks offense began the fourth quarter with an incomplete pass from Daniels intended for Tanaka Scott, and they settled for a field goal which brought their deficit down to 15 points. Arkansas gained 11 yards on a Jefferson rush on their first play and 8 yards on two Green rushes but an offensive pass interference penalty on 3rd & 2 brought the ball back to the Arkansas 29-yard-line for 3rd & 17. Jefferson passed to Hudson Henry for a gain of 11 yards but Max Fletcher was forced to come on to punt, and the kick was downed at the Kansas 16-yard-line. The teams then traded three-and-outs: Kansas lost 4 yards on the first play of their next series and were unable to gain any yardage, prompting them to punt and down the kick at the Arkansas 35-yard-line. Arkansas rushed for 8 yards in their first two plays but gained no yards on 3rd & 2 and punted back to Kansas; the kick was fair caught at the Kansas 22-yard-line by Burroughs. Kansas started with a 20-yard pass from Daniels to Scott, and Daniels gained a first down with an 8-yard rush several plays later. The Jayhawks converted third down on their next series with a 6-yard pass from Daniels to Thomas, but were pushed back with a sack on the next play for a loss of four yards. A 14-yard pass to Arnold gained a first down but three incompletions on their next four plays resulted in a turnover on downs at the Arkansas 21-yard-line. Green carried on the first two plays of the Razorbacks' ensuing drive, gaining 7 yards in total, before Jefferson converted third down with a 43-yard pass to Landers. Landers gained 15 yards on a rush but fumbled and the ball was recovered by Cobee Bryant and returned to the Arkansas 48-yard-line. Daniels passed to Fairchild for 15 yards to reach the Arkansas 33-yard-line on Kansas's first play, and several more rushes gave Kansas another first down. After a sack by Jordan Domineck, Daniels found Kevin Terry for 30 yards and then passed to Douglass Emilien for a 10-yard touchdown, pulling Kansas within eight points. The ensuing onside kick was recovered by Kansas at midfield and the Jayhawks struck quickly with a 34-yard pass to Grimm on their first play. Two incomplete passes followed before Kansas was called for a delay of game penalty that pushed them back to 3rd & 15 from the Arkansas 21-yard-line, but Daniels passed to Grimm for a touchdown on the next play, bringing them to within two points, and a successful pass on the two-point conversion tied the game with 41 seconds remaining. Dubinion rushed for 11 yards on Arkansas' second play and Green gained 9 yards and a first down several plays later, giving the Razorbacks two seconds remaining to run a play; Green got the carry and gained 35 yards but the clock ran out and the game went to overtime.

Overtimes

Arkansas won the coin toss and chose to play defense first, so Kansas started the first overtime period on offense. Daniels started quickly as he passed to Grimm for a 17-yard gain on the first play of overtime, and three straight rushes by Thomas advanced the Jayhawks to the Arkansas 2-yard-line. On 4th & Goal, Daniels completed a pass to Jared Casey in the end zone for a touchdown, and Piepergerdes added the extra point to put Kansas ahead by seven. On their corresponding overtime possession, Jefferson began with a 19-yard pass to Landers and handed the ball off to Dubinion on the next play, who was able to find the end zone for a touchdown. Little tied the game with an extra point of his own, sending the game to double overtime.

Arkansas had the first possession of double overtime, and their first play was a 5-yard pass from Jefferson to Green. On second down, Jefferson kept it on the ground and ran for a 20-yard touchdown; he followed that up with a completed pass to Wilson for a two-point conversion. Daniels started Kansas's possession with a 3-yard rush and the Jayhawks were called for holding on the next play, bringing them back to the Arkansas 32-yard-line for 2nd & 17. Daniels responded well with an 11-yard pass to Fairchild and a 19-yard pass to Arnold to set up a 2-yard rush of his own for a touchdown. On the two point-conversion, Daniels rushed and was stopped short but a targeting penalty called on McAdoo gave Kansas another try. Daniels then passed to Casey, tying the game again and sending it to a third overtime.

In the third overtime and beyond, teams have one play each, a two-point conversion from the 3-yard-line, rather than full possessions from the 25-yard-line; Arkansas scored theirs, with a Jefferson pass to Dubinion, to take the lead again and force Kansas to convert theirs in order to stay in the game. They failed, on an incomplete pass by backup quarterback Jason Bean, and the game ended after three overtimes with Arkansas defeating Kansas, 55–53. The total duration of the game was four hours and sixteen minutes.

Scoring summary

Statistics

Aftermath

As a result of the game, Arkansas finished with a winning season and a final record of 7–6, while Kansas finished a losing season with a final record of 6–7. Kansas quarterback Jalon Daniels performed to expectations and set a Liberty Bowl record with 544 net passing yards, and his 37 completions, five touchdown passes, and six total touchdowns (including his one rushing touchdown) all set Liberty Bowl records as well. Kansas drew the game even from an 18-point deficit entering the fourth quarter, and they would have become the second team to overcome a deficit of 18 points or more during the 2022 season, after Houston did so against Memphis on October 8, had they won the game. Arkansas quarterback KJ Jefferson was named most valuable player.

On December 29, the day following the game, the targeting call on Arkansas cornerback Quincey McAdoo in double overtime was overturned following a review of the play by the NCAA Football Rules Committee and coordinator of officials Steve Shaw. The conclusion of the review was that the play by McAdoo was not targeting and that he should not have been disqualified for the remainder of the game; additionally, he will not have to sit out the first half of Arkansas' 2023 opener against Western Carolina. The play was one of several controversial calls noted by analysts, which also included a fumble call against Arkansas wide receiver Matt Landers in the fourth quarter that was upheld after replay review despite the appearance that Landers still had possession of the ball when he hit the ground.

References

Liberty Bowl
Liberty Bowl
Liberty Bowl
Liberty Bowl
Kansas Jayhawks football bowl games
Arkansas Razorbacks football bowl games